The Asfeld-Montcornet railway was a  long, metre gauge railway in northeastern France, commissioned in 1909 and operated until 1957.

Route of the line 
22 km of the line ran in the département of Ardennes and 22 km in the département of Aisne.

History 
The Asfeld-Montcornet metre-gauge railway was built by the Chemins de fer départementaux des Ardennes in 1909 and operated until 1957. During the harvest season in the summer of 1914, eight regular trains ran daily on the Asfeld-Montcornet line for the transport of sugar beet.[3] The line was used for the transport of sugar beet.

Stations

References 

Railway lines in Grand Est
metre gauge railways in France
Chemins de fer départementaux des Ardennes